Max Annett (6 February 1931 – 6 July 2015) was an Australian rower. He competed in the men's coxed four event at the 1960 Summer Olympics.

References

1931 births
2015 deaths
Australian male rowers
Olympic rowers of Australia
Rowers at the 1960 Summer Olympics